Agnes Zimmermann (5 July 184714 November 1925) was a German concert pianist and composer who lived in England.

Biography
Agnes Marie Jacobina Zimmermann was born in Cologne, Germany. Her family moved to England, and she was enrolled at the Royal Academy of Music at the age of nine, where her teachers were Charles Steggall and Cipriani Potter. Later she studied under Ernst Pauer and Sir George Macfarren. Zimmermann received the Kings Scholarship from 1860 to 1862 and made her public debut 1863 at The Crystal Palace playing Beethoven's Emperor Concerto.

After ending her studies, Zimmermann went on a tour of Germany, followed by concert tours in 1879, 1880, 1882 and 1883. She published her own editions of Sonatas by Beethoven and Mozart and compositions by Robert Schumann. Zimmermann moved in with feminist Lady Louisa Goldsmid after the latter's husband, barrister Sir Francis Goldsmid died in 1878. Zimmermann was said to have given eighteen years of "devoted attention" to Goldsmid and it has been speculated that this was a lesbian relationship.
During the 1880 decade, she composed Variations on Mendelssohn's ‘ ‘Hirtenlied’ (Shepherd's Song).

Several notable composers dedicated works to her, including George Alexander Macfarren's Three Sonatas (1880) and Michele Esposito's Ballades, Op. 59 (1907).

Zimmermann died in London in 1925.

Works
Zimmermann composed music for chamber orchestra, piano solos, and vocal pieces.

Selected works include:
Three sonatas for piano and violin, Opp. 16, 21 and 23
Cello Sonata, Op. 17 (published 1872 by Schott)
Trio for piano, violin and cello, Op. 19
Presto alla Tarantella, Op. 15
 Variations on Mendelssohn's ‘Hirtenlied’ (1880)

References

https://www.musichaven.co.uk/scores/variations-on-mendelssohn's-'hirtenlied'

External links

 https://www.musichaven.co.uk/scores/variations-on-mendelssohn's-'hirtenlied'

1845 births
1925 deaths
19th-century classical composers
19th-century German composers
19th-century classical pianists
20th-century classical composers
Women classical composers
German classical composers
German women composers
German classical pianists
German women pianists
German music educators
Jewish classical composers
20th-century German composers
Women music educators
Women classical pianists
20th-century women composers
19th-century women composers
20th-century German women
19th-century women pianists
20th-century women pianists